Macrolenes may refer to:
 Macrolenes (beetle), a genus of beetles in the family Chrysomelidae
 Macrolenes (plant), a genus of plants in the family Melastomataceae